Chepngeno is a surname of Kenyan origin. Notable people with the surname include:

Edna Chepngeno (born 1977), Kenyan volleyball player
Hellen Chepngeno (born 1967), Kenyan cross country runner
Jackline Chepngeno (born 1993), Kenyan long-distance runner

Kalenjin names